Melanie Hoffmann (born 29 November 1974) is a German former footballer who played as a midfielder.

International career
Hoffmann competed for the Germany national team at the 2000 Summer Olympics.

Honours
FCR 2001 Duisburg
 Bundesliga: 1999–00; runner-up 1996–97, 1998–99, 2004–05
 German Cup: 1997–98; runner-up 1998–99, 2002–03

Germany
 FIFA Women's World Cup: runner-up 1995
 UEFA Women's Championship: 1997
 Summer Olympic Games: Bronze medal 2000

References

External links
 
 
 

1974 births
Living people
German women's footballers
Germany women's international footballers
FCR 2001 Duisburg players
1995 FIFA Women's World Cup players
1999 FIFA Women's World Cup players
Footballers at the 2000 Summer Olympics
Olympic bronze medalists for Germany
SGS Essen players
Olympic medalists in football
Medalists at the 2000 Summer Olympics
Women's association football midfielders
Philadelphia Charge players
Women's United Soccer Association players
German expatriate women's footballers
German expatriate sportspeople in the United States
Expatriate women's soccer players in the United States
Olympic footballers of Germany
UEFA Women's Championship-winning players